Axxess & Ace is the third album by Songs: Ohia. It was recorded by Michael Krassner at Truckstop Studios in Chicago, Illinois, United States, and released by Secretly Canadian on March 15, 1999.

Track listing
All songs written by Jason Molina.
 "Hot Black Silk" – 3:08
 "Love & Work" – 3:34
 "Love Leaves Its Abusers" – 3:47
 "Redhead" – 4:19
 "Captain Badass" – 7:40
 "Come Back to Your Man" – 5:57
 "Champion" – 2:39
 "How to Be Perfect Men" – 4:04
 "Goodnight Lover" – 6:58

Recording information
 Jason Molina
 Geof Comings (Party Girls)
 Michael Krassner (the Lofty Pillars, Boxhead Ensemble, Edith Frost Band)
 Joe Ferguson (Pinetop Seven)
 Dave Pavkovic (Boxhead Ensemble)
 Julie Liu (Rex)
 Edith Frost

External links
 Secretly Canadian press release

References

1999 albums
Jason Molina albums
Secretly Canadian albums